The following is a List of Coastal Batteries in Australia and Territories during World War II. The main threat came early in the war from German raiders and threat of Japanese raids or invasion, and hence all available ordnance was pressed into service, including some obsolete guns and field guns adapted for coast defence.

New South Wales

Newcastle
Park Battery, The Hill – 2 x 6in Mk VII guns 
 Scratchley Battery, Newcastle East – 2 x 6in Mk VII guns and 1 x 6pdr 10cwt gun
 Wallace Battery, Stockton – 2 x 9.2in Mk X guns

Port Kembla

 Breakwater Battery, Port Kembla – 2 x 6in Mk XI guns
 Drummond Battery, Coniston – 2 x 9.2in Mk X guns
 Illowra Battery, Port Kembla – 2 x 6in Mk XI guns

Port Stephens
Tomaree Battery, Shoal Bay – 2 x 6in Mk VII guns

Sydney

Banks Battery, North of Cape Banks, La Perouse – 2 x 9.2in Mk X guns
Casemate Battery, Middle Head – 2 x 6pdr 10cwt guns
Henry Battery, Henry Head, La Perouse – 2 x 18pdr Mk IV guns
Hornby Battery, South Head – 2 x 6in Mk VII guns
Malabar Battery, Malabar Headland, Malabar – 2 x 6in Mk XII guns
Middle Head Fortifications, Middle Head – 2 x 6in Mk VII guns, 1 x QF 12-pounder gun
North Battery, North Head – 2 x 9.2in Mk X guns
Shelly Battery, Shelly Head, Manly – 1 x 12 pdr 12cwt gun
Signal Battery, South Head – 2 x 6in Mk XI guns
West Battery, West Head – 2 x 4.7in guns

Note: A 6pdr 10cwt battery was under construction.

Northern Territory
Dudley Battery, Darwin – 2 x 4in Mk VII guns and 1 x 6pdr 10cwt gun
East Battery, Darwin – 2 x 9.2in Mk X guns, 2 x 6in Mk XI guns 
Emery Battery, Darwin – 2 x 6in Mk XI guns
Waugite Battery, Darwin – 2 x 6in Mk XI guns
Elliot Section – 1 x 6pdr 10cwt gun
West Point Section, Darwin – 1 x 6pdr 10cwt gun

Papua New Guinea

Lae
U Battery – 4 x 155mm guns

Port Moresby
Paga Battery – 2 x 6in Mk XI guns, 2 6pdr 10cwt guns
Boera Battery – 2 (?) x 155mm guns

Rabaul
 Praed Point Battery – 2 x 6in Mk VII guns

Queensland

Brisbane
Bribie Battery, Bribie Island – 2 x 6in Mk XI guns
Skirmish Battery, Bribie Island – 2 x 155mm guns
Cowan Battery, Moreton Island – 2 x 6in Mk XI guns
Rous Battery, Moreton Island – 2 x 155mm guns
Lytton Battery, Lytton – 1 x 4.7in gun

Cairns
False Cape Battery, East Trinity – 2 x 155mm guns

Torres Strait
Endeavour Battery – 2 x 6in Mk XI guns
Goods Battery – 2 x 6in Mk XI guns
Kings Battery – 2 x 18pdr Mk IV guns
Milman Battery, Thursday Island – 1 x 4.7in gun
Turtle Battery – 2 x 155mm guns

Townsville

Magazine Battery, South Townsville – 2 x 155mm guns
Kissing Point Battery, North Ward – 2 x 6in Mk VII guns
Magnetic Battery, Magnetic Island – 2 x 155 mm guns
Cape Pallarenda Battery, Pallarenda – 2 x 4.7in Mk IV guns

South Australia
 Fort Largs, Taperoo – 2 x 6in Mk VII guns
 Hummock Hill Battery, Whyalla – 4 x 3.7in Mk II or III AA guns

Tasmania
 Direction Battery, Hobart – 2 x 6in Mk VII guns
 Pierson Battery, Hobart – 1 x 6in Mk VII gun

Victoria
Cribb Battery, Port Phillip – 1 x 6in Mk VII gun
Crow's Nest Battery, Queenscliff – 2 x 4.7in guns and 1 x 14pdr gun
Lonsdale Battery, Point Lonsdale – 2 x 6in Mk VII guns
 Nepean Battery, Point Nepean – 2 x 6in Mk VII guns
 Pearce Battery, Point Nepean – 2 x 6in Mk VII guns

Western Australia

Albany
Princess Battery, Albany – 2 x 6in guns

Fremantle

Harbour Battery, Fremantle – 2 x 6pdr 10cwt, 2 x 18pdr Mk IV guns
Leighton Battery, Fremantle – 2 x 6in Mk VII guns
Swanbourne Battery, Fremantle – 2 x 6in Mk VII guns
Note: A 9.2in Mk Xv battery was under construction.

Garden Island (Cockburn Sound)
Beacon Battery, Garden Island – 2 x 4in ex-US naval guns
Challenger Battery, Garden Island – 2 x 155mm guns
Collie Battery, Garden Island – 2 x 12pdr 12cwt guns

Geraldton
Geraldton Battery, Geraldton – 2 x 4in ex-US naval guns, 2 x 18pdr Mk IV guns

Rockingham
Peron Battery, Cape Peron – 2 x 155mm, 2 x 18pdr Mk IV guns

Rottnest Island
Bickley Battery, Rottnest Island – 2 x 6in Mk XI guns
Oliver's Battery, Rottnest Island – 2 x 9.2in Mk X guns

See also

 Military history of Australia
 Structure of the Australian Army during World War II
 Anti-aircraft defences of Australia during World War II
 Hobart coastal defences
 Sydney Harbour defences

Notes

References

External links

Military history of Australia during World War II
Artillery units and formations of Australia
Forts in Australia
Coastline of Australia